Edward Richard Dudley (March 11, 1911 – February 8, 2005) was an American lawyer, judge, civil rights activist and the first African-American to hold the rank of Ambassador of the United States, as ambassador to Liberia from 1949 to 1953.

Life

Dudley was born on March 11, 1911, in South Boston, Virginia, to Edward Richard and Nellie (nee Johnson) Dudley. He graduated with a bachelor of science degree from Johnson C. Smith College in 1932 where he became a member of Alpha Phi Alpha fraternity, and then taught school in Gainsboro, Virginia. He studied dentistry for a year on a scholarship at Howard University, and then moved to New York City.

In New York, Dudley worked in odd jobs including stage manager for Orson Welles at a public works theater project. In 1938, he enrolled at St. John's University School of Law, graduating with an LL.B. in 1941. For a brief period he practiced law, entered Democratic politics in Harlem, and was an assistant New York State attorney general in 1942. In 1942, he married Rae Oley. They had a son, Edward R. Dudley III.

In 1943, he joined the N.A.A.C.P. legal team. As an assistant special counsel, he wrote briefs and prepared cases seeking the admission of black students to Southern colleges, equal pay for black teachers and an end to discrimination in public transportation.

He was executive assistant to the governor of the Virgin Islands from 1945 to 1947, and was then appointed by President Harry S. Truman as minister to Liberia in 1948 and then as ambassador in 1949. Returning home in 1953, he practiced law and directed the N.A.A.C.P.'s Freedom Fund. In 1955, New York City's mayor, Robert F. Wagner, Jr., appointed him as justice of the Domestic Relations Court.

Dudley was the borough president of Manhattan from 1961 to 1964. In the New York state election of 1962, he was the Democratic and Liberal candidate for attorney general but was defeated by the Republican incumbent, Louis Lefkowitz. He was a delegate to the 1964 Democratic National Convention. J. Raymond Jones was influential in helping Dudley in New York politics.

In November 1964, Dudley was elected as a justice of the New York State Supreme Court for the First Judicial District (Manhattan and the Bronx), a post he held from 1965 until his retirement in 1985.

Death
Dudley died of prostate cancer in St. Luke's Hospital in Manhattan on February 8, 2005, aged 93. He was survived by his widow, their son, two brothers (Dr. Calmeze Dudley and Dr. Hubert Dudley) and three grandchildren (Kevin, Kyle and Alexandra Dudley).

The Dudley family summered in the SANS community, buying their lot during the 1950s expansion into Sag Harbor Hills. The cottage is presently occupied by the Dudley family.

In 2022, Dudley was featured in The American Diplomat, a PBS documentary that explores the lives and legacies of three African-American ambassadors.

See also
Harlem Clubhouse

Further reading
 John C. Walker,The Harlem Fox: J. Raymond Jones at Tammany 1920:1970, New York: State University New York Press, 1989.
 Paterson, David "Black, Blind, & In Charge: A Story of Visionary Leadership and Overcoming Adversity." New York, New York, 2020
David N. Dinkins, A Mayor's Life: Governing New York's Gorgeous Mosaic, PublicAffairs Books, 2013
Rangel, Charles B.; Wynter, Leon. And I Haven't Had a Bad Day Since: From the Streets of Harlem to the Halls of Congress. New York: St. Martin's Press, 2007.
Baker Motley, Constance Equal Justice Under The Law: An Autobiography, New York: Farrar, Straus, and Giroux, 1998.
Howell, Ron Boss of Black Brooklyn: The Life and Times of Bertram L. Baker  Fordham University Press Bronx, New York, 2018
Jack, Hulan Fifty Years a Democrat:The Autobiography of Hulan Jack New Benjamin Franklin House New York, NY, 1983
Clayton-Powell, Adam Adam by Adam:The Autobiography of Adam Clayton Powell Jr. New York, New York, 1972
Pritchett, Wendell E. Robert Clifton Weaver and the American City: The Life and Times of an Urban Reformer Chicago: University of Chicago Press, 2008
Davis, Benjamin Communist Councilman from Harlem:Autobiographical Notes Written in a Federal Penitentiary New York, New York, 1969

References

External links
Diplomats laud first black U.S. ambassador (1994)
Biodata at U.S. Secretary of State website
Profile at Political Graveyard

-

Johnson C. Smith University alumni
Howard University alumni
1911 births
2005 deaths
People from Roanoke, Virginia
People from South Boston, Virginia
New York Supreme Court Justices
African-American people in New York (state) politics
Ambassadors of the United States to Liberia
Sag Harbor Hills, Azurest, and Ninevah Beach Subdivisions Historic District
Manhattan borough presidents
St. John's University School of Law alumni
African-American lawyers
20th-century American lawyers
New York (state) Democrats
African-American diplomats
20th-century American diplomats
20th-century American judges
20th-century African-American people
21st-century African-American people